Sportsbrand is a wholly owned subsidiary of the privately owned Australian company, Bennelong Group.

Sportsbrand's head office is situated in Melbourne, and has its marketing and production operations in London, Dubai and Vancouver. It has been operating since 1991.

Sportsbrand deals with premium television production and international distribution of television and related media properties with a number of complementary operations in the sports marketing arena.

It has produced many sports television series like 
ICC Cricket World and
FIBA World Basketball.

External links
Official site of Sportsbrand

Television production companies of Australia
Sports management companies